A borg is a "giant extrachromosomal element with the potential to augment methane oxidation", described by Basem Al-Shayeb and Jill Banfield.  Borgs are long DNA sequences existing alongside the main chromosome in the archaea Methanoperedens, in oxygen-starved environments such as deep mud.

Borgs are considered to be a new form of "giant linear plasmids" or giant viruses rather than  unknown DNA elements. They co-occur within a species of archaea  which likely hosts them and shares many of their genes. The archaeon's main chromosome is only three times larger, and their capacity for anaerobic oxidation of methane as well as other biological functions – such as production of proteins – may be augmented by borgs.

References

Microbiology
DNA